Div Kola-ye Alimun (also Romanized as Dīv Kolā-ye Alīmūn; also known as Alīmūn) is a village in Hasan Reza Rural District, in the Central District of Juybar County, Mazandaran Province, Iran. At the 2006 census, its population was 877, in 246 families.

References 

Populated places in Juybar County